Doxiadis is a Greek surname, and may refer to:

Apostolos Doxiadis (born 1953), Greek writer
Aristos Doxiadis (born 1951), Greek economist
Constantinos Apostolou Doxiadis (1913–1975), Greek architect

Greek-language surnames